The lilioid monocots are a group of 33 interrelated families of flowering plants. They generally have tepals (indistinguishable petals and sepals) similar to those on the true lilies (Lilium). Like other monocots they usually have a single embryonic leaf (cotyledon) in their seeds, leaves with parallel veins, scattered vascular systems, flower parts in multiples of three, and roots that can develop in more than one place along the stems.
 
The lilioid grade includes five orders: Asparagales, Dioscoreales, Liliales, Pandanales and Petrosaviales. Asparagales is roughly tied with Poales for the most diverse monocot order and includes Orchidaceae, the largest flowering plant family with more than 26,000 species. Plants in Dioscoreales, such as yams, usually have inflorescences with glandular hairs. In Liliales, plants often have elliptical leaves with up to seven primary veins, inflorescences at the tips of stems, and nectar-producing glands on the tepals. Pandanales includes fragile, non-herbaceous and drought-tolerant species, with leaves often arranged in three vertical rows. Petrosaviales includes species with spirally arranged leaves, nectar-producing glands, and racemes (unbranched inflorescences with short flower stalks).

Legend

Lilioid families

See also

Notes

Citations

References
 
 
   See the Creative Commons license.
 
 
 
  
 
 See their terms-of-use license.
 
 
 
 

 

Systematic
Taxonomic lists (families)
Gardening lists
Lists of plants